The 1921 Northern Ireland general election was held on Tuesday, 24 May 1921. It was the first election to the Parliament of Northern Ireland. Ulster Unionist Party members won a two-thirds majority of votes cast and more than three-quarters of the seats in the assembly. Sinn Féin in particular was shocked at the scale of the Unionist victory, having spent considerable resources on the campaign, and had expected to win between 1/3 and 1/2 of the seats. The election was conducted using the single transferable vote system.

The election took place during the Irish War of Independence, on the same day as the election to the parliament of Southern Ireland. As the election in Southern Ireland was merely a formality, with all candidates being returned unopposed (and therefore guaranteeing Sinn Féin complete dominance), Sinn Féin was able to focus its resources entirely on the election in Northern Ireland. The Sinn Féin campaign focused on the issue of partition implemented by the Government of Ireland Act 1920, with Sinn Féin and the Nationalist party running on a combined anti-partition ticket.

Sinn Féin campaign
Sinn Féin invested considerable resources in their campaign, placing advertisements in almost 50 northern newspapers making a range of arguments against partition. Sinn Féin also published its own newspaper, The Unionist, of which 50,000 copies were sent to prominent Protestants in East Ulster, particularly County Antrim. In particular, Sinn Féin claimed there was widespread ignorance over the situation in Ulster and warned against the economic dangers of partition, particularly in relation to threats of a renewed boycott against northern goods in a manner similar to the "Belfast Boycott". Sinn Féin also attempted to attract Ulster's rural and agricultural workers, arguing partition would put them at the mercy of eastern Ulster's urban elites.

Despite the scale and organisation of the campaign, its arguments failed to resonate with voters, with the party's chief organiser Eamon Donnelly claiming on the day of the election that all Sinn Féin's efforts had achieved was assuring a high Unionist turnout.

Results

|}

Total electorate: 582,464; turnout: 88.0% (512,842).

Votes summary

Seats summary

See also
1921 Irish elections
List of members of the 1st Parliament of Northern Ireland

Footnotes

References
Northern Ireland Parliamentary Election Results 

Northern Ireland general election
1921
Northern Ireland general election
General